Malcolm Bruce Kennard (born in 1967) is an Australian born actor of theatre, film and television. He has appeared in a wide variety of roles in Australia, from soap opera to mini-series and made for television films and also in US productions.

Career 
After doing bit parts in country theatrical productions, Kennard studied acting before making his professional début at the Grant Street Theatre in Melbourne, Australia.

Screen appearances soon followed, and he has worked in theatre, film and television ever since. In 1993, Mal received an AFI Award nomination for Best Actor in a Leading Role for Television Drama, for his performance as "Luke Shaw" in Joh's Jury.

Personal life 
Born in Sydney, he spent most of his youth in country New South Wales, before returning to the city for work. He also lived in various parts of the United States during an extended hiatus.

Filmography 
Movies
 Backtrack
 The Menkoff Method
 My Mistress
 Showboy
 Needle
 The Matrix Reloaded
 Bad Bush
 Diana & Me
 Amy
 Secrets

Television 
 Catching Milat
 Devil's Playground
 Old School
 An Accidental Soldier
 Bikie Wars: Brothers in Arms
 The Straits
 Rush TV
 Killing Time
 Masters of Horror
 Joh's Jury
 E Street
 A Country Practice

Theatre 
A partial list of his theatre credits follows:

The Tragedy of Julius Caesar
It'S Ralph
The Ad Man
Suddenly Last Summer
The Judas Kiss

References

External links 
 

1967 births
Living people
Male actors from Sydney
21st-century Australian male actors